Mark Vincent Woodford (born May 24, 1984 in Madison, Wisconsin), better known by his stage name The Audible Doctor, is a Brooklyn-based American record producer and underground rapper. The Audible Doctor has been credited as producer in critically acclaimed studio albums and EPs including Made In The Streets, 2057, The Ports, Reporting Live, Computer Era, Free Agent and Thug Matrix 3. On 3 January 2014, he was listed in AllHipHop 's "Top 50 Underground/Indie/Emerging Artists Of 2013" before he went on to make a guest appearance at the 2014 edition of the annual Brooklyn Hip-Hop Festival. He is a member of the Brown Bag AllStars, a group of emcees he joined while interning at Fat Beats in 2007.

Biography
Born and raised in Madison, Wisconsin, The Audible Doctor started music having piano and guitar lessons while growing up until his days in high school when he started collecting records and DJing at friends' parties.

In 2002, The Audible Doctor moved to New York to attend an audio engineering and recording school before he started working at Fat Beats store after graduating from college. While interning at Fat Beats, he collaborated with funk group Skull Snaps to release his first production project titled Skull Snaps Meet The Audible Doctor in 2005 and It's A New Day Redux in 2006.

In 2010, The Audible Doctor left Fat Beats and released his first solo EP titled The Crackers then Brownies Deluxe in 2011. He had his first major break as a producer after he was credited in Joell Ortiz's second studio album entitled Free Agent, an album that debuted at #173 on the Billboard 200 with 4,000 copies sold in its first week released.

On 25 September 2012, The Audible Doctor released his critically acclaimed EP titled I Think That... which further earned him more attention from music critics before he went on to release an album titled Doctorin on 30 October 2012. On 24 November 2014, he released an EP titled Can't Keep The People Waiting, the EP featured vocal appearances from acts like Astro, Hassan Mackey of Mello Music Group, Consequence, Bumpy Knuckles, Guilty Simpson and John Robinson.

On 20 June 2015, The Audible Doctor released an EP entitled The Spring Tape off his Seasons EP set which include The Winter Tape and The Summer Tape. His style of production has seen him work with notable acts like 50 Cent for the freestyle titled "This Is Murder Not Music," Astro, Koncept, Fredro Starr, Joell Ortiz, and many more.

Discography

Singles

Credits

References

External links

Official website

1984 births
Living people
Businesspeople from Madison, Wisconsin
American hip hop record producers
20th-century American pianists
American electronic musicians
East Coast hip hop musicians
Musicians from Madison, Wisconsin
21st-century American pianists